ORP Warszawa was a . Built in Leningrad in the 1950s, she was originally named Spravedlivy in the Soviet Navy. She was later transferred to the Polish Navy in 1970, the only ship of this class to be so transferred. She served until 1986 when the vessel was decommissioned.

References

Couhat, Jean Labayle and A.D. Baker III. Combat Fleets of the World 1986/87. Annapolis, Maryland, USA:Naval Institute Press, 1986. .
Gardiner, Robert and Stephen Chumbley. Conway's All The World's Fighting Ships 1947–1995. Annapolis, Maryland, USA:Naval Institute Press, 1995. .

Kotlin-class destroyers of the Polish Navy
Cold War destroyers of Poland
Poland–Soviet Union relations
1956 ships
Ships built in the Soviet Union
Ships built in Saint Petersburg